Catherine of Hungary (/Katalina; c. 1256 – after 1314) was a Queen consort of Serbia by her marriage to Stephen Dragutin of Serbia. She was the second daughter of Stephen V of Hungary and his wife Queen Elizabeth, daughter of Seyhan, chieftain of the Cumans.

Family
Catherine was the second of six children. Her sister Elizabeth also became a Queen of Serbia, by her marriage to Stephen Dragutin's brother, Stefan Milutin. Catherine's brother was Ladislaus IV of Hungary.

Catherine's paternal grandparents were Béla IV of Hungary and his wife Maria Laskarina.

Queenship
The efforts of Catherine's grandfather, Bela IV of Hungary to secure his southern boundary while moving toward the Adriatic included establishing leaders in Srem (John Angelos) and Slavonia (Rostislav Mikhailovich) who were not only capable but also closely connected to the royal family. It is quite reasonable that an effective way to at least neutralize Serbia under Uros would be to connect him through dynastic marriage to Hungarian nobility, whether by diplomacy or force. Such use of dynastic marriage occurred, for example, in 1268 when Stephen Uroš I of Serbia unsuccessfully attempted to conquer Macva (Macsó). The result was the marriage of Catherine to his son Stephen Dragutin of Serbia in c.1268. A detailed reexamination of the relations between Hungary and Serbia in the period 1240-1265, and especially around 1250, would be expected to show that the marriage of Helen of Anjou and Stephen Uros was a natural outcome of political factors. Such a study would also aid in illuminating later developments in Hungarian-Serbian relations.

For example, it is well known that Dragutin was given Macva, Usor and Soli by his brother-in-law Ladislas IV of Hungary after yielding the Serbian throne to his brother Milutin in 1282. It has been assumed that he was known as King of Srem because these territories south of the Sava included those which at one time were called Sirmia ulterior by the Hungarians, even though only Sirmia citerior between the Sava and Danube was normally known as Srem. Dragutin received many of these lands due to his marriage to Catherine.

Catherine's children were heirs to the throne of Hungary when Catherine's brother Ladislaus died childless, after neglecting his wife, Elizabeth of Sicily, for the sake of their Cuman family. However, Catherine's children did not inherit Hungary, her distant cousin, Andrew III of Hungary inherited instead, though his claim was in question because other European monarchs believed that Hungary was in their possession. However, Catherine's son Stefan Vladislav II of Syrmia was always a pretender to Hungary even after the death of Andrew III in 1301. Catherine and her son were in competition with her nephews. Catherine's nephew, Charles Martel of Anjou gave them the province of Slavonia even though it did not belong to him.

A Byzantine envoy who visited the Serbian court about 1268 to participate in ultimately failed negotiations for a marriage alliance wrote of the conditions at court disparagingly: 
The Great King [Uroš] as he is called, lives a simple life in such a way that would be a disgrace for a middling official in Constantinople; the king's Hungarian daughter-in-law [Katalin] works at her spinning wheel in a cheap dress; the household eats like a pack of hunters or sheep-stealers. 

Near the end of his life, Catherine's husband separated from his Hungarian friends, gained from their marriage and strengthened his connections in Serbia. He later became a monk and changed his name to Teoktist. He died in 1316 and was buried in the Đurđevi Stupovi monastery near Novi Pazar.

Catherine herself died sometime after 1314, others are not sure when she died.

Issue
Catherine and Stephen Dragutin had three children:
Stefan Vladislav II, king of Srem (1316–1325).
Elisabeth, married in 1284 to Stephen I, Ban of Bosnia, becoming mother of Stephen II, Ban of Bosnia.
Urošic, monk.

References

Sources

 
 
 
 
 

|-

Hungarian princesses
14th-century Serbian royalty
Medieval Serbian royal consorts
Nemanjić dynasty
House of Árpád
Year of birth uncertain
People of Cuman descent
14th-century Serbian people
14th-century Serbian women
14th-century Hungarian people
14th-century Hungarian women
Daughters of kings